George Mortimer Kramer (born 15 May 1929) is an American chess player, Chess Olympiad individual bronze medal winner (1950).

Biography
After World War II George Kramer was one of the most promising new chess players in the United States. In 1945, at the age of sixteen, he won the New York State Chess Championship. 
In 1946, he debuted in U.S. Chess Championship where ranked at 9th place. In 1952, George Kramer won Manhattan Chess Club Championship.

George Kramer played for United States in the Chess Olympiad:
 In 1950, at reserve board in the 9th Chess Olympiad in Dubrovnik (+5, =5, -3) and won  individual bronze medal.

In later years, George Kramer was no longer repeated these results in chess tournaments. He also participated twice in the U.S. Chess Championships (1957, 1962) but ranked at the bottom of the table each time. In 1960s he three times won New Jersey State Chess Championships (1964, 1967, 1969).

References

External links

George Kramer chess games at 365chess.com

1929 births
Living people
Sportspeople from New York City
American chess players
Chess Olympiad competitors